David Chidozie Okereke (born 29 August 1997) is a Nigerian professional footballer who plays as a forward for  club Cremonese.

Club career

Spezia
He made his professional debut in the Serie B for Spezia on 9 April 2016 in a game against Novara. In 2018–19 season, he scored 10 goals and 12 assists in 33 games.

Club Brugge
On 9 July 2019, he signed a four-year contract with Club Brugge.

Venezia (loan) 
On 12 August 2021, Okereke joined newly promoted Serie A club Venezia on a season-long loan with an option to make the transfer permanent.

Cremonese 
On 28 July 2022, Okereke joined Cremonese, on a three-year contract for a reported fee of €10 million.

Personal life
On 15 September 2020 he tested positive for COVID-19.

Career statistics

Club

Honours 
Club Brugge
 Belgian Pro League: 2019–20, 2020–21
 Belgian Super Cup: 2021

References

External links

Living people
1997 births
Sportspeople from Lagos
Association football forwards
Nigerian footballers
U.S.D. Lavagnese 1919 players
Spezia Calcio players
Cosenza Calcio players
Club Brugge KV players
Venezia F.C. players
U.S. Cremonese players
Serie A players
Serie B players
Serie C players
Serie D players
Belgian Pro League players
Nigerian expatriate footballers
Expatriate footballers in Italy
Nigerian expatriate sportspeople in Italy
Expatriate footballers in Belgium
Nigerian expatriate sportspeople in Belgium